The 2022 BOSS Open was a men's tennis tournament played on outdoor grass courts. It was the 44th edition of the Stuttgart Open, and part of the ATP Tour 250 series of the 2022 ATP Tour. It was held at the Tennis Club Weissenhof in Stuttgart, Germany, from 6 June until 12 June 2022.

Champions

Singles 

  Matteo Berrettini def.  Andy Murray 6–4, 5–7, 6–3

Doubles 

  Hubert Hurkacz /  Mate Pavić def.  Tim Pütz /  Michael Venus, 7–6(7–3), 7–6(7–5)

Points and prize money

Point distribution

Prize money 

*per team

ATP singles main draw entrants

Seeds

1 Rankings are as of 23 May 2022.

Other entrants
The following players received wildcards into the main draw:
  Feliciano López
  Jan-Lennard Struff
  Stefanos Tsitsipas 

The following players received entry from the qualifying draw:
  Radu Albot
  Christopher O'Connell
  Jurij Rodionov
  Dominic Stricker

Withdrawals
Before the tournament
  Lloyd Harris → replaced by  Daniel Altmaier
  Sebastian Korda → replaced by  João Sousa
  Reilly Opelka → replaced by  Jiří Lehečka
  Holger Rune → replaced by  Denis Kudla

ATP doubles main draw entrants

Seeds

1 Rankings are as of 23 May 2022.

Other entrants
The following pairs received wildcards into the doubles main draw:
  Dustin Brown /  Evan King
  Petros Tsitsipas /  Stefanos Tsitsipas

Withdrawals
Before the tournament
  Alexander Bublik /  Holger Rune → replaced by  Alexander Bublik /  Nick Kyrgios
  Santiago González /  Andrés Molteni → replaced by  Jonathan Erlich /  Aslan Karatsev
  Kevin Krawietz /  Andreas Mies →  Fabrice Martin /  Andreas Mies
  Nikola Mektić /  Mate Pavić → replaced by  Hubert Hurkacz /  Mate Pavić

References

External links 
 
 ATP tournament profile

Stuttgart Open
Stuttgart Open
BOSS Open
BOSS Open